Elizabeth Faith Currer Buchanan, CVO (born 1963) was formerly Private Secretary to the Prince of Wales.

Buchanan worked in public relations. She was a spokeswoman for United Kingdom Prime Minister Margaret Thatcher, and a political adviser to Cecil Parkinson and Paul Channon at the Department of Transport.

She then worked for a public relations firm run by Timothy Bell, from which she was assigned in 1998 on a two-year secondment to the Office of the Prince of Wales as Assistant Private Secretary (with specific responsibility for rural matters). She stayed however until 2002, when she became Deputy Private Secretary. She was made Private Secretary to The Prince in 2005.

Already a Lieutenant of the Royal Victorian Order (LVO), Buchanan was appointed Commander of the Royal Victorian Order (CVO) in the 2009 New Year Honours.

Footnotes

1963 births
Living people
British public relations people
Commanders of the Royal Victorian Order
Members of the Household of the Prince of Wales